Saint-Michel-de-Bannières is a commune in the Lot department in south-western France. There is a twelfth-century church fortified during the later 15th century. The current mayor is Gaëligue Jos, elected in 2020.

The population was 317 in 2018 (+5% as compared to 2008), with 48% men and 52% women. About 7.3% of the population was unemployed in 2018 as compared to 6.3% in 2008.

See also
Communes of the Lot department

References

Saintmicheldebannieres